Való Világ (lit. Real World) is Hungary's reality show aired by RTL. ValóVilág became the most popular Hungarian reality television program ever. The show was aired in the same time slot as the localized version of Big Brother. While TV2 recorded the highest number of viewers in 2002, Való Világ 1 had an average of 1.5 million. In 2003, Való Világ 2 was a breakthrough. While it had 1.75 million viewers daily, Big Brother 2 recorded only 800,000 viewers. RTL started the third season, which was an absolute success with 2.06 million viewers daily. The first three seasons were broadcast between 2002 and 2004 but returned in November 2010 for the fourth season after years of hiatus.

In the sixth season, it was transferred to the newly launched channel RTL Kettő. For the seventh season in Autumn 2014, RTL Kettő remained the host.

The show holds the Big Brother license since the eighth season and using the name Való Világ powered by Big Brother.

Series details

Casting and choice of the viewing public 
The contestants who had been succeed in the casting could participate in a Beszavazóshow (Vote-In Show). During a beszavazóshow, the viewing public had to choose from the three wannabe villa residents: who they wanted to participate in the show. The person with the most votes would enter the Villa (house) and became officially a villa resident.

In the sixth season, the beszavazóshow was changed into Beköltözés (The Entering Show). In the beköltözés, the creators-chose person (in the first beköltözés 6 people) enters into the Villa.

Elimination process 

Kiválasztás (Selection): The villa residents have to nominate one fellow villa resident in front of each other, live on RTL Klub. The villa resident with the most votes would face eviction.

Kihívás (Challenge): The villa resident, who became up for eviction earlier, have to choose a fellow villa resident whom he/she thought he/she would be a perfect partner to against in the eviction process. (In the second and third season the selected villa resident had to choose two villa residents. The viewers had to decide from the two villa residents, which would join the selected one and face eviction with him/her.)

Párbaj (Duel): The two villa residents visits the studio and there presenter shows them short videos from their life in the house. During the discussing which the presenter has with the two villa residents the public can vote for them via phone calls and text message. At the end of the Duel the results of the public vote is revealed. The villa resident who received more votes can go back to the House and continue the game. The villa resident with the fewest vote had to leave the studio and the game as well.

Aréna (Arena): In season 5 the Duel winner did not get instant immunity. The villa residents were fighting for immunity facing various challenges in the Arena which was built next to the house.

Season 1 
Start Date: 11 September 2002
End Date: 22 December 2002
Duration: 102 days
Contestants:
The Finalists: Szabolcs (The Winner), Majka (Runner-up) & Oki (3rd)
Evicted Contestants: Niki, Hajni, Leslie, Lorenzo, Ági, Nóri & Györgyi

Season 2 
Start Date: 1 January 2003
End Date: 31 May 2003
Duration: 152 days
Contestants:
The Finalists: Laci (The Winner), Anikó (Runner-up) & Péter (3rd)
Evicted Contestants: Csöpke, Mónika, Elvis, Kismocsok, Rita, Zsolti, Solya, Béka, Sziszi & Gábor

Season 3 
Start Date: 28 December 2003
End Date: 4 June 2004
Duration: 160 days
Contestants:
The Finalists: Milo (The Winner), Leo (Runner-up) & Katka (3rd)
Evicted Contestants: Segal, Pandora, Szilvi, Jenny, Indián, Frenki, Tommyboy, Ágica, Marcsi, Anett & Csaba

Season 4 
Start Date: 20 November 2010
End Date: 8 May 2011
Duration: 165 days

{| class="wikitable" style="font-size:85%; text-align:center; line-height:15px; width: 100%;"
|-
! rowspan="3" style="width:7%"|
! style="width:7%"|1.
! style="width:7%"|2.
! style="width:7%"|3.
! style="width:7%"|4.
! style="width:7%"|5.
! style="width:7%"|6.
! style="width:7%"|7.
! style="width:7%"|8.
! style="width:7%"|9.
! style="width:7%"|10.
! style="width:7%"|Finale
|-
! colspan="2" | 2010 
! colspan="9" | 2011
|-
! 15 December !! 27 December !! 5 January !! 19 January !! 5 February !! 19 February !! 5 March !! 26 March !! 10 April !! 24 April !! 8 May
|-
! colspan="12" style="background:#000;" |
|-
! Alekosz
| Anikó || Anikó || Zsófi || Gigi || Olivér || Gigi || Béci || László || Béci || Anikó || style="background:#73FB76" |Winner(Spent 165 days in the house)
|-
!Jerzy
| Gina || Zsófi || Anikó || Anikó || Gombi || Gombi || Szandika || Éva || Anikó || Éva || style="background:#D1E8EF" |Runner-up(Spent 152 days in the house)
|-
!Éva
| Olivér || László || Ildi || Gigi || Olivér || Jerzy || Jerzy || Jerzy || Béci || Anikó || style="background:#FBF373" |Third Place(Spent 165 days in the house)
|-
!Anikó
| Alekosz || Alekosz || Jerzy || Jerzy || Gombi || Jerzy || Éva || Gigi || Jerzy || Alekosz || style="background:#fa8072" | Evicted(Spent 154 days in the house)
|-
!Béci
| Éva || Ildi || Éva || Alekosz || Anikó || Gombi || Szandika || Éva || Alekosz || colspan="2" style="background:#fa8072" | Evicted(Spent 144 days in the house)
|-
!László
| Éva || Olivér || Éva || Alekosz || Olivér || Gombi || Szandika || Alekosz || colspan="3" style="background:#fcf" | Gave up(Spent 133 days in the house)
|-
!Gigi
| Zsuzsi || Ildi || Éva || Alekosz || Anikó || Gombi || Anikó || Éva || colspan="3" style="background:#fa8072" | Evicted(Spent 130 days in the house)
|-
!Szandika
| Gombi || Ildi || Ildi || Gigi || Olivér || Gombi || Gigi || colspan="4" style="background:#fa8072" | Evicted(Spent 102 days in the house)
|-
!Gombi
| Éva || Jerzy || Jerzy || Jerzy || Jerzy || Alekosz || colspan="5" style="background:#fa8072" | Evicted(Spent 82 days in the house)
|-
!Olivér
| Zsófi || Zsófi || Ildi || László || Béci || colspan="6" style="background:#fa8072" | Evicted(Spent 80 days in the house)
|-
!Zsófi
| Alekosz || Olivér || Alekosz || Alekosz || colspan="7" style="background:#fa8072" | Evicted(Spent 65 days in the house)
|-
!Ildi
| style=background:white | Not inHouse || Szandika || Gombi || colspan="8" style="background:#fa8072" | Evicted(Spent 23 days in the house)
|-
!Gina
| Éva || Olivér || colspan="9" style="background:#fcf" | Gave up(Spent 23 days in the house)
|-
!Kristóf
| Éva || Olivér || colspan="9" style="background:#fa8072" | Evicted(Spent 21 days in the house)
|-
!Leonidasz
| Éva || colspan="10" style="background:#fa8072" | Evicted(Spent 19 days in the house)
|-
!Zsuzsi
| Alekosz || colspan="10" style="background:#FFE08B" | Disqualified(Spent 12 days in the house)
|-
! colspan="12" style="background:#000;" |
|-
!Selected
| Éva || Olivér || Ildi || Alekosz || Olivér || Gombi || Szandika || Éva || Béci || Anikó || rowspan="2" | –
|-
!Challenged
| Leonidasz || Kristóf || Éva || Zsófi || Béci || Alekosz || Béci || Gigi || Jerzy || Éva 
|-
!Duel
|Éva(72%)Leonidasz(28%) || Olivér(54%)Kristóf(46%) || Ildi(38%)Éva(62%) || Alekosz(71%)Zsófi(29%) || Olivér(39%)Béci(61%) || Gombi(29%)Alekosz(71%) || Szandika(40%)Béci(60%) || Éva(51%)Gigi(49%) || Béci(46%)Jerzy(54%) || Anikó(49%)Éva(51%) || Éva(22%)Jerzy(44%)Alekosz(56%)|-
!Evicted| style="background:salmon;" |Leonidasz|| style="background:salmon;" |Kristóf|| style="background:salmon;" |Ildi|| style="background:salmon;" |Zsófi|| style="background:salmon;" |Olivér|| style="background:salmon;" |Gombi|| style="background:salmon;" |Szandika|| style="background:salmon;" |Gigi|| style="background:salmon;" |Béci|| style="background:salmon;" |Anikó|| style="background:salmon;" |ÉvaJerzy|}

 Season 5 Start Date: 17 September 2011End Date: 26 February 2012Duration: 163 days

 – Immunity

 Season 6 Start Date: 12 January 2014End Date: 11 May 2014Duration: 120 days

 Season 7 Start Date: 16 November 2014End Date: 1 March 2015Duration: 105 days

 – Not allowed to vote. Guardian voted instead.
 – The challenged person was chosen before the selection by the show because of a punishment.
 – Dori's vote counted as a double-vote.

 Season 8 Való Világ powered by Big Brother Season 9 Való Világ 9 powered by Big Brother Season 10 Való Világ X powered by Big Brother'''

References

External links
 Official website
 Való Világ 5 Fansite

Hungarian reality television series
2000s Hungarian television series
2010s Hungarian television series
2002 Hungarian television series debuts
Hungarian-language television shows
RTL (Hungarian TV channel) original programming

cs:VyVolení
sk:VyVolení